Langona warchalowskii is a jumping spider species in the genus Langona that lives in South Africa. It was first identified by Wanda Wesołowska in 2007.

References

Endemic fauna of South Africa
Salticidae
Spiders of South Africa
Spiders described in 2007
Taxa named by Wanda Wesołowska